Elvin Miguel Rodríguez (born March 31, 1998) is a Dominican professional baseball pitcher in the Tampa Bay Rays organization. He has played in Major League Baseball (MLB) for the Detroit Tigers. He made his MLB debut in 2022.

Career

Los Angeles Angels
Rodríguez signed with the Los Angeles Angels as an international free agent on July 4, 2014. He spent his professional debut season of 2015 with the DSL Angels, going 0–6 with a 4.59 over 51 innings. He split the 2016 season between the DSL and the AZL Angels, going a combined 4–2 with a 1.53 ERA over  innings. He split the 2017 season between the Orem Owlz and the Burlington Bees, going a combined 5–3 with a 2.91 ERA over 68 innings. He was named the Pioneer League Pitcher of the Year.

Detroit Tigers
On September 15, 2017, Rodríguez was traded to the Detroit Tigers as the PTBNL in the Justin Upton trade.

Rodríguez spent the 2018 season with the West Michigan Whitecaps, going 8–7 with a 3.34 ERA over  innings. He spent the 2019 season with the Lakeland Flying Tigers, going 11–9 with a 3.77 ERA over  innings. He did not play in 2020 due to the cancellation of the Minor League Baseball season because of the COVID-19 pandemic. On November 8, 2021, the Tigers purchased Rodríguez's contract, adding him to the 40-man roster.

Rodríguez made the Tigers' Opening Day roster for the 2022 season. He made his MLB debut on April 10, 2022, pitching in relief against the Chicago White Sox. On the season, he made seven appearances for the Tigers (five of them starts), and scuffled to an 0-4 record and 10.62 ERA with 25 strikeouts in 29.2 innings pitched. He elected free agency on November 10, 2022.

Tampa Bay Rays
On January 18, 2023, Rodríguez signed a minor league contract with the Tampa Bay Rays organization.

See also
 List of Major League Baseball players from the Dominican Republic

References

External links

1998 births
Living people
Arizona League Angels players
Burlington Bees players
Detroit Tigers players
Dominican Republic expatriate baseball players in the United States
Dominican Summer League Angels players
Erie SeaWolves players
Lakeland Flying Tigers players
Major League Baseball pitchers
Major League Baseball players from the Dominican Republic
Orem Owlz players
Tigres del Licey players
Toledo Mud Hens players
West Michigan Whitecaps players